Aada Pettanam is a 1958 Indian Telugu-language drama film, produced by M. Narayana Swamy and M. Venkata Ramadasu and directed by Adurthi Subba Rao. It stars Akkineni Nageswara Rao and Anjali Devi, with music jointly composed by S. Rajeswara Rao and Master Venu. Anisetty was announced as the director initially, but Adurthi Subba Rao took over later.

Plot
The film begins in a village, where a wealthy couple, Ganapathi (Chadalavada) & Rangamma (Kannamba) has a son Krishna (Akkineni Nageswara Rao) and a daughter Swarajyam (Suryakala). Virago Rangamma maintains the household and scorns the step-son Krishna. Krishna falls for his childhood friend Radha (Anjali Devi), daughter of school teacher Ramaiah (Perumallu). Learning it, Ramaiah moves with the wedding proposal when Rangamma desires Rs. 10,000 of dowry. So, Ramaiah approaches malicious President Kondaiah (Gummadi), one that tramples the villagers by providing loans. Ramaiah mortgages his property and acquires the amount. But, Kondaiah aspires to possess Radha, so, he steals the dowry amount which makes avaricious Rangamma cancel the match. During that plight, Ramaiah agrees to couple up Radha with Kondaiah when Radha attempts suicide. Krishna rescues and marries her, as a result, he has to quit the house. At the same time, Lokanadham (Relangi) a stage artist traps Rangamma, intrudes into their house and weds Swarajyam. Ramaiah passes away and Kondaiah seizes his property. Krishna establishes a school & Cooperative Bank in the village and ameliorates the lifestyles of the destitute, which irks Kondaiah. Eventually, Ganapathi becomes terminally ill when Rangamma transfers the property on her behalf by the provocation of Lokhanadham. After the death of Ganapathi, Rangamma excludes Krishna from the property. Soon after, Lokhanadham forges and pawns the property to Kondaiah. Immediately, Kondaiah occupies it when Rangamma obstructs his way, but she is forsaken. At that time, Krishna & Radha aids her, drives the blackguards out and reforms Lokhanadham. At last, Rangamma realizes the virtue of Krishna & Radha. Finally, the movie ends on a happy note with the reunion of the entire family.

Cast
Akkineni Nageswara Rao as Krishna
Anjali Devi as Radha
Relangi as Lokanadham
Gummadi as President Kondaiah
Chadalavada as Ganapathi
Allu Ramalingaiah as Peraiah
Perumallu as Ramaiah 
Balakrishna as Srungaram
Kannamba as Rangamma
Raja Sulochana as Kalavathi
Chhaya Devi as Machamma
Suryakala as Swarajyam

Crew
Art: Thota
Choreography: A. K. Chopra, Venu Gopal
Lyrics: Samudrala Sr., Sri Sri, Kosaraju, Arudra, Malladi Ramakrishna Sastry
Playback: Ghantasala, P. Susheela, Jikki, Madhavapeddi Satyam, Pithapuram, P. Leela, Swarnalatha
Music: S. Rajeswara Rao, Master Venu
Story — Dialogues : Pinisetti Srirama Murthy
Editing: M. Babu
Cinematography: T. S. Ajith Kumar
Producer:  M. Narayana Swamy, M. Venkata Ramadasu 
Screenplay — Director: Adurthi Subba Rao
Banner: Prabha Productions
Release Date: 6 August 1958

Soundtrack

Music was composed by S. Rajeswara Rao & Master Venu. Music was released on Audio Company.

References

External links
 

Indian drama films
Films scored by S. Rajeswara Rao
Films about women in India
1958 drama films
1958 films
1950s Telugu-language films
Films directed by Adurthi Subba Rao
Films scored by Master Venu